Heineken (also Yamaha 1, Pontona Youth) is a Volvo Ocean 60 yacht. She finished ninth in the W60 class of the 1993–94 Whitbread Round the World Race skippered by Dawn Riley.

Career
Yamaha 1 was the first Whitbread 60 ever built and was used as a trial boat for Ross Field's team. It was built by Cookson Boats in New Zealand. When Yamaha was finished the yacht was leased to American skipper Dawn Riley, who finished ninth among the W60s of the 1993–94 Whitbread Round the World Race having an all-women crew.

Yamaha 1 competed in the 2003 Volvo Baltic Race with the name Pontona Youth and crewed by a Danish youth team skippered by Thomas Dahl Jensen.

References

Volvo Ocean Race yachts
Sailing yachts of the United States
Sailing yachts built in New Zealand
Volvo Ocean 60 yachts
1990s sailing yachts
Sailing yachts of Denmark